Tesnusocaris goldichi is an extinct species of remipedian crustacean that lived in the Pennsylvanian period, the one of the two representatives of the extinct remipedian Order Enantiopoda. Its fossil is from the Lower Pennsylvanian (Paleozoic, Carboniferous) Tesnus formation, Texas.  The other known enantiopod remipedian is Cryptocaris hootchi of the Mazon Creek fauna.

References

Remipedia
Carboniferous crustaceans
Monotypic arthropod genera
Carboniferous animals of North America